Headgum is an American podcasting network founded in 2015 by Marty Michael, Amir Blumenfeld, and Jake Hurwitz. The latter twoknown collectively as comedy duo Jake and Amirbuilt upon the success of their podcast If I Were You to launch the network, with the show serving as its flagship program. Before founding Headgum, Michael sold advertising space and branded content for CollegeHumor. Headgum has studios in Los Angeles and New York and, hosts 57 shows, 34 of which are ongoing. Headgum also features an active YouTube channel and presents Headgum Live!, a series of live shows featuring podcast hosts from the network.

Programming

Current

A Funny Feeling
Comedians and supernatural enthusiasts Betsy Sodaro and Marcy Jarreau discuss paranormal experiences with their comedian friends and celebrity guests. Past guests include Aubrey Plaza and Sasheer Zamata. The show debuted on September 29, 2017.

All Fantasy Everything
Host Ian Karmelwith frequent co-hosts Sean Jordan and David Gborieconducts a fantasy draft for pop culture topics with guests. People who have appeared on the podcast include Ron Funches and Kumail Nanjiani, who together drafted video games; Jon Cryer, who drafted candy; and Katie Nolan, who drafted MTV shows. The show premiered on September 15, 2016, and has aired 125 episodes as of March 28, 2019.

John-Michael Bond of The Daily Dot praised All Fantasy Everything as one of the top comedy podcasts of 2018, describing it as "a refreshing change of pace".

Buckets With Amir Blumenfeld
Amir Blumenfeld and guests discuss basketball. Buckets premiered on August 22, 2018, and has featured appearances from Ben Schwartz; Jerry Ferrara; and Hayes Davenport.

Doughboys

Doughboys features Mike Mitchell and Nick Wiger reviewing chain restaurants. The show has featured appearances from Sarah Silverman, for the review of McDonald's; Ike Barinholtz, for the review of Top Round Roast Beef; Haley Joel Osment, for the review of Quizno's; and Gillian Jacobs, who joined the Doughboys for their fourth review of Taco Bell. Premiering on May 21, 2015, as part of the Feral Audio network, Doughboys transitioned to Headgum in April 2018 following the shutdown of its previous provider. As of April 2019, the Doughboys Patreon account is the 8th most popular among podcast Patreons, with over 7000 patrons.

Brian Reinhart of The Dallas Observer lauded the mix of humor and food criticism evident in the podcast, describing Mitchell and Wiger as "Americas funniest food critics".

Dynamic Banter
Hosts and friends, Mike Falzone and Steve Zaragoza tackle a different topic each week andonce monthlypresent a movie commentary episode labelled "The Commentarium". Dynamic Banter is a continuation of the hosts prior podcast, Cloverfeels, and debuted on May 5, 2016reaching 150 episodes in April 2019.

Gilmore Guys

Veteran fan Kevin T. Porter and show newcomer Demi Adejuyigbe provide an episode-by-episode analysis of Gilmore Girls. Gilmore Guys premiered on October 1, 2014, and featured appearances from comedian guests, such as Retta and Lauren Lapkus, as well as actors from the show, such as Lauren Graham and Milo Ventimiglia. The original release concluded on June 3, 2017, and was succeeded by the hosts reviewing Bunheads, and then The Marvelous Mrs. Maisel, for which Alice Wetterlund replaced Adejuyigbe as a host of the podcast.

Girls On Porn
Girls on Porn is a porn review podcast hosted by Rachel Napoleon and Laura Ramadei. Each week, they research and review porn based on popular search terms. The podcast was launched March 6, 2019.

Good Christian Fun

Kevin T. Porter and Caroline Ely explore the world of Christian pop culture. Good Christian Fun premiered on August 30, 2017.

Good One: A Podcast About Jokes
Host Jesse David Fox, Vulture.com Senior Editor, and a comedian guest discuss a famous joke of their choice. The podcast has featured episodes with Kevin Hart, Ray Romano, Nick Kroll, Will Forte, Bo Burnham, Jimmy Fallon, John Mulaney, Jerry Seinfeld, and Weird Al Yankovic. Good One, a joint project with Vulture, premiered on February 13, 2017.

Hey Riddle Riddle
On Hey Riddle Riddle, improv artists Adal Rifai, Erin Keif, and John Patrick Coan attempt to solve riddles, puzzles, and whodunits while discussing and dissecting them along the way. The podcast debuted on July 25, 2018, and has since drawn praise from Forbes, Observer and The Irish Times, in which it was lauded as being "high octane and hilarious".

High and Mighty
Jon Gabrus hosts this podcast where he invites celebrities and friends on to discuss a different topic each episode. Past guests include Paul Scheer, Adam Pally, and Bobby Moynihan. High and Mighty premiered on July 30, 2015, and aired its 200th episode on March 28, 2019.

If I Were You

Headgum co-founders Jake and Amir host this flagship comedy advice podcast, which has been running since May 10, 2013. The podcast has featured numerous recurring guest appearances; such as Ben Schwartz, who has guested 15 times; Thomas Middleditch, who has guested 10 times; Hoodie Allen, who has guested 4 times; and Allison Williams, who has guested 3 times. On September 16, 2019, the podcast aired its 400th episode.

Sam Tabachnik of The Washington Post has written of If I Were You that it exemplifies how Jake and Amir "have their fingers firmly on the pulse of the digital comedy scene", while Kayla Culver of The Concordian likened the podcast to "listening to two best friends having a hilarious conversation on the couch next to you".

Just a Tip with Megan Batoon
Megan Batoon hosts this advice podcast. Just a Tip first aired on March 30, 2018, and reached 50 episodes on March 22, 2019.

Lackluster Video
Actors Finn Wolfhard and Billy Bryk host this podcast discussing and dissecting their favorite movies and movies that do not exist. Lackluster Video first aired on September 9, 2020.

Newcomers
Hosts Lauren Lapkus and Nicole Byer watch films and television series from franchises that they both have little to no experience with and discuss their feelings. Newcomers debuted on January 28, 2020, with the first season focusing on the Star Wars franchise. Subsequent seasons have focused on The Lord of the Rings (and other works of Middle-earth in film) and the works of Tyler Perry.

No Joke
Each episode, Harvard Sailing Team members and comedians Billy Scafuri and Adam Lustick discuss their history and relationship with a single topic. No Joke debuted on February 5, 2016.

Not Another D&D Podcast
CollegeHumor alumni Brian K. Murphy, Emily Axford, Jake Hurwitz and Caldwell Tanner present this Dungeons & Dragons actual play podcast. The first main campaign follows the adventures of "the band of boobs"composed of Axford, Hurwitz, and Tanner's respective characters: Moonshine Cybin, a Crick elf Druid; Hardwon Surefoot, a human fighter raised by dwarves; and Beverly ToegoldV, a teenaged "City Halfling". Murphy serves as the dungeon-master for the campaign, which frequently features guest appearances. Not Another D&D Podcast, or "NADDPod", has amassed over 20,000 patrons for the show's Patreon account. The podcast premiered on February 2, 2018, and reached episode 100 concluding its first major campaign on May 10, 2020.

Overdue
Hosts Craig Getting and Andrew Cunningham host this podcast about notable literature. Each week, Craig and Andrew discuss a book in their backlog. Overdue premiered on February 11, 2013, and on April 1, 2019, reached its 350th episode.

Perfect Person
Miles Bonsignore and "freelance associate sidekick" Will Witwer host this comedy advice show. Each week, Miles and Will answer audience calls, solve their problems, and help listeners achieve maximum perfection.

Punch Up the Jam
Each week, comedian and musician Miel Bredouw reviewed a popular song segment by segment before presenting a "punch-up" that comedically "improves" the song in question. Punch Up the Jam has featured appearances from Griffin McElroy, for the punch-up of "Send Me on My Way"; Mara Wilson, for the punch-up of "Semi-Charmed Life"; and Grace Helbig, for the punch-up of "Welcome to the Jungle". The podcast premiered on December 21, 2017, originally with Bredouw and Demi Adejuyigbe as the show's co-hosts. Punch Up the Jam has received praise from numerous outlets, including Metro; Vulture.com; and Pitchfork.

On the July 4, 2019, episode of the podcast, Adejuyigbe announced that he would no longer be involved with the show. Bredouw continued the show as its sole host. Throughout most of 2020, Breouw co-hosted the show with Chris Fleming. The podcast was also expanded to feature contributions from musician and music theorist Rob Moose, which was referred to as the show's "weatherman" segment. The final episode of the show with Bredouw hosting was posted in December 2020. A year later, the podcast format was revived by Headgum with Andrew and Evan Gregory of The Gregory Brothers as hosts.

Review Revue
A weekly show hosted by Reilly Anspaugh and Geoffrey James that blends conversation and improv comedy based on the most absurd reviews on the internet. Guests have included Jeff Probst talking about Sandals Resorts, Ryan Gaul talking about haunted houses, and Finn Wolfhard talking about indoor trampoline parks. Review Revue first aired on January 13, 2020. The show has received positive reviews from outlets such as Vulture.com.

Robot Congress
Ryan "Video Game Attorney" Morrison, Austin Hoffman, and Ali Rothman, analyze and discuss topics around the intersection of law and technology. As of March 9, 2019, the podcast has released 81 episodes.

SitcomD&D
Erin Keif, Waleed Mansour, Elizabeth Andrews, Sean Coyle, and Ben Briggs star in a weekly podcast which blends sitcoms with Dungeons & Dragons. SitcomD&D premiered on February 15, 2022.

Too Scary; Didn't Watch
The horror movie recap podcast for those too scared to watch for themselves. In this weekly podcast Emily Gonzalez, Henley Cox, and Sammy Smart recap and discuss popular horror movies. Released on August 14, 2019.

The Baby-Sitters Club Club

Jack Shepherd and Tanner Greenring go through and discuss Ann M. Martin's The Baby-Sitters Club novels. The Baby-Sitters Club Club debuted on February 23, 2016.

The Complete Guide to Everything

The Complete Guide to Everything is a weekly podcast that delves in to a wide array of topics, driven by hosts Tom Reynolds and Tim Daniels' quests to make the world a more informed place. The podcast aired its 500th episode on January 14, 2019.

The Dumbbells
Eugene Cordero and Ryan Stanger host this comedic fitness-themed podcast. The Dumbbells premiered on October 26, 2016, and reached 125 episodes on March 20, 2019.

The Easy Chair
Author Laura Hurwitzwith occasional guestshosts this podcast which features weekly readings of short stories. The Easy Chair reached its 175th episode on December 11, 2018.

The Headgum Podcast
Host Geoffrey James waxes nonsensical with a rotating cast of his coworkers reluctantly serving as guests. 104 episodes have aired since the show's debut on May 13, 2020.

The Jeff Rubin Jeff Rubin Show
Jeff Rubin interviews creative people who have pursued careers based on their personal interests. The Jeff Rubin Jeff Rubin Show debuted on March 8, 2013, and has featured appearances from R.L. Stine, Pete Holmes, and Chris Gethard.

This Is Why You're Single
Writers of a humorous advice book of the same name, Laura Lane and Angela Spera meet weekly to analyze and explain real-life dating disasters. This Is Why You're Single premiered on July 30, 2015.

Three Black Halflings
Hosts Jasper William Cartwright, Jeremy Cobb, and Liv Kennedy host discussions on the intersection of black culture and table-top role playing games such as Dungeons & Dragons. This variety show includes actual play campaigns, interviews, gameplay tips and discussion of Black experience within nerd culture. The show has produced 138 episodes and was announced as part of the Headgum network by episode 47.

Tig and Cheryl: True Story

Hosts Tig Notaro and Cheryl Hines discuss documentary films every week. Tig and Cheryl: True Story premiered on September 14, 2020.

Twinnovation
Each episode identical twins Dave and Jeff Rosenberg (CollegeHumor/Funny Or Die alum) alongside Queen Ana Merida, comically design get-rich-quick schemes and inventions. Marc Heshon of Huffington Post has written of the podcast that "the ideas [are] all pretty bad, but... the explaining of them is pretty damn funny". Twinnovation debuted on July 30, 2015, and was featured at the 35th annual Just for Laughs festival. They have joined HeadGum for shows at SXSW as well as Chicago, Brooklyn and NYC. As of May 6, 2019, host Mike Karnell (mama bear) is no longer a member of the Twinnovation Podcast.

We Hate Movies
Each week, Andrew Jupin, Stephen Sajdak, Eric Szyszka and Chris Cabin force themselves to watch and review infamous movies and box-office flops. We Hate Movies has aired over 558 episodes in its primary format as of July 2021. There are also hundreds of bonus Patreon episodes which cover various TV shows such as Melrose Place; Beverly Hills, 90210; and Star Trek; as well as full length commentaries for films.

We Watch Wrestling
Standup comedians Matt McCarthy and Vince Averill host this wrestling-centric podcast which premiered in 2013.

What The Tuck? A RuPaul's Drag Race Podcast
A joint project between Headgum and Vulture.com, What the Tuck? A RuPaul's Drag Race Podcast is dedicated to the recapping of weekly RuPaul's Drag Race episodes. Hosts Nicole Byer and Joel Kim Booster reacted to RuPaul's Drag Race All Stars (season 4) in the first season of the podcast. Mano Agapion and Matt Rogers took over the hosting duties for the second season of the podcast, in which they discuss RuPaul's Drag Race (season 11). What The Tuck? was launched on December 17, 2018.

Why Won't You Date Me?

Why Won't You Date Me? is a quest to find why host Nicole Byer is perpetually single; exploring topics relating to love, life and sex along the way. The podcast premiered on December 1, 2017, and has featured appearances from Sasheer Zamata, Jameela Jamil, and Trixie Mattel. Why Won't You Date Me has been described as "a hilarious chronicle of [Nicole Byer's] dating life as she connects her own struggles to the bigger issues within the dating world", and was awarded 'Outstanding Foreign Series' at the 2019 Canadian Podcasting Awards.

Retired programs

2 Jews Talking
Josh Heller and Erika Brooks Adickman analyze pop culture, gender, politics, and life, from a Jewish standpoint. 2 Jews Talking premiered on April 4, 2016, and was retired after 90 episodes on February 5, 2019.

8-Bit Book Club
Hosts Brian Murphy, Emily Axford, and Caldwell Tanner discuss video game novels. 8-Bit Book Club debuted on September 27, 2016, and aired its final episode on April 2, 2018.

Black Girls Talking
Hosts Alesia, Fatima, Aurelia, and Ramou provide their opinions on a diverse range of topics, with specific attention to the perspective and representation of people of color. Black Girls Talking ended on October 13, 2016.

Cloverfeels
Mike Falzone and Steve Zaragoza review and analyze the 'Cloverfield' movie franchise. Cloverfeels aired its last episode on August 16, 2017; becoming a segment on Falzone and Zaragoza's Dynamic Banter! podcast.

Come Out, Come Out
Each episode, host Mo Welch invites a guest onto the podcast to talk about their experience with coming out. Come Out, Come Out was retired on September 15, 2017.

Coupla Questions
Hosts Dannielle & Claire interview their favorite couples about how they fell in love and how they stayed in love. Coupla Question ended on July 19, 2016.

Dead Eyes
Actor and comedian Conor Ratliff tries to solve a "very stupid mystery": after being cast for a small roll in an episode of HBO's Band of Brothers directed by Tom Hanks, the latter reportedly said he had "dead eyes" and had him fired. This leads Ratliff to discuss various aspects of working in show-business with his guests. The 31st and last episode of Dead Eyes aired on October 3rd, 2022, with Ratliff interviewing Tom Hanks.

Don't Get Me Started
Will Hines and Anthony King talk to talented people about what they love–rather than about their work. Don't Get Me Started has featured appearances from Jason Mantzoukas, D'Arcy Carden, and Matt Walsh. The podcast concludedafter running for almost 3 yearson August 22, 2017.

Doodie Calls with Doug Mand
Comedian and writer Doug Mand talks to guests about their most embarrassing bathroom moments and other awkward experiences. Past guests on the podcast include Phil Lord, Rachel Bloom, and Bob Saget. Doodie Calls ran for over 6 years; ending on June 28, 2018.

Food is the New Rock
Zach Brooks talks music with a chef, or food with a musician. The podcast has featured guest appearances from a wide array of talents including the likes of: Kiernan Shipka; Moby; Steve Aoki; Paul Stanley; Kelis; The Wombats; Jason Lee; Wolfgang Puck; Doug Benson; Questlove; Alt J; Portugal. The Man; Harley Morenstein; Eddie Huang; Jon Favreau; Fall Out Boy; Curtis Stone; Tenacious D; Rachael Ray; and Action Bronson. The podcast concluded on August 31, 2016, with its 200th episode.

Headgum Fantasy Basketball League
A podcast documenting the Headgum Fantasy Basketball League, where members appear on the show to discuss their thoughts and actions. The podcast ended on January 17, 2017.

Headgum Fantasy Football League
A podcast documenting the Headgum Fantasy Football League, where members appear on the show to discuss their thoughts and actions. After 35 episodes, the podcast ended on June 1, 2017.

I Feel Ya
Hosts Katie Hilliard and Elaine Carroll present this podcast intended around cultivating empathy. I Feel Ya was retired on December 11, 2017.

I'm Still Right
Luke Kelly-Clyne hosts two guests who engage in longstanding debates of theirs. I'm Still Right concluded on February 14, 2019.

It Feels like the First Time
Steve Zaragoza, Owen Carter, and Brett Register rewatch TV shows and movies. It Feels like the First Time was retired after 78 episodes, on November 13, 2018.

====Lady Lovin'''====
Jilly Hendrix, Greta Titelman, and Lo Bosworth discuss all things female empowerment, from romance, to health, to entrepreneurship. The show premiered on August 17, 2015, and was retired on December 31, 2018, after 169 episodes.

Let's Talk About Me, Baby
Actor and musician Utkarsh Ambudkar sits down with friends and relatives to discuss his life and career. The podcast featured appearances by Lin-Manuel Miranda, Randall Park, Joe Manganiello, Hasan Minhaj, and Rachael Leigh Cook. After 54 episodes, Let's Talk About Me, Baby was retired on September 6, 2017.

Make Me Like It
Guests attempt to convince hosts Kelly Hudson and Dan Klein to like things that they currently do not. Guests who appeared on Make Me Like It include Paul F. Tompkins, Paul Scheer, and Horatio Sanz. The podcast premiered on April 7, 2016, with the 90th, and last, episode airing on October 25, 2018.

Shock and Awesome
Chris "Shockwave" Sullivan interviews comedians and musicians to understand their creative inspirations. Features on the show include Lin-Manuel Miranda and Wayne Brady. The show was retired on April 20, 2018.

That Was Us
Every episode, a guest joins Julia Nunes and shares an embarrassing anecdote of who they used to be. The final episode of That Was Us aired on April 21, 2017.

The Coe Show
Former ESPN radio personality Tyler Coe hosts this sport-related podcast. It was retired on November 5, 2016.

The Earthling's Podcast
William Haynes, Yessica Hernandez Cruz and John Ros host this comedic discussion podcast. The Earthling's Podcast premiered on April 3, 2017, and was retired on February 19, 2018.

The Mindhouse Project
Host Josh Ruben and guests discuss a wide variety of topics. Guests who appeared on The Mindhouse Project include Thomas Middleditch, Patrick Wilson, and Matt McGorry. The podcast was retired on September 19, 2017.

What Did I Miss
A current events podcast, hosted by comedians Susanna Wolff and Siobhan Thompson. What Did I Miss was retired on December 16, 2016.

What Should We Draw?
Illustrators Caldwell Tanner and Nathan Yaffe take inspiration from their conversation to design a drawing, publishing the finished drawings to their tumblr of the same name. The podcast debuted on February 22, 2016, and was retired on March 14, 2018, after 75 episodes.

 Videos 
The Headgum YouTube channel was launched on February 8, 2016. The channel features uploads of filmed podcast episodes, IRL videos, and livestreams, as well as three original comedy series featuring Headgum employees and occasionally podcast hosts; Geoffrey the Dumbass, Off Days, and Day in the Strife. , the channel has amassed over 52,000 subscribers and 24 million views.

 Headgum Live! 
In addition to their podcasting and YouTube releases, Headgum has also presented multiple live shows. Headgum Live!'' is described as "a night of improv, sketch, stand-up, and more featuring the staff, podcasters, and friends of the Headgum podcast network". The shows have been performed at the UCB and Hayworth theatres in Los Angeles, as well as in Montreal at the Just for Laughs 2017 festival, and in Austin, at SXSW in 2016, 2017, and 2018.

References

External links
 

Headgum
Podcasting companies